On January 27, 2001, Dartmouth College professors Half and Susanne Zantop, aged 62 and 55 respectively, were stabbed to death at their home in Etna, New Hampshire. Originally from Germany, the couple had been teaching at Dartmouth since the 1970s. High school classmates James J. Parker, age 16, and Robert W. Tulloch, age 17, were charged with first-degree murder.

Parker pleaded guilty to second-degree murder in exchange for testifying against Tulloch, and was sentenced to 25 to life.  Tulloch pleaded guilty to first-degree murder and received the mandatory sentence of life imprisonment without parole. In 2014 the New Hampshire Supreme Court ordered Tulloch's sentence reviewed.

Half and Susanne Zantop 

Half Zantop met Susanne Korsukewitz while they were both studying at Stanford University in the mid-1960s. They were both from Germany. Fascinated with geology, Half had earned a bachelor's degree from Freiburg University, while Susanne was working on her master's degree in political science. After Half earned a Ph.D. in geology in 1969 at Stanford and worked as a field geologist, he and Susanne were married in 1970. They had two daughters, Veronika and Mariana. 

Susanne taught in the German department at Dartmouth College and was chair of that faculty. Half taught geology and earth science, and was popular among many of his students. In 2000, they had begun discussing retirement in the near future.

The murders 

Tulloch and Parker went to the Zantop residence on the morning of January 27, 2001. Posing as students doing research for a school survey, they intended to take the occupants by surprise, threaten them into revealing their PINs, and rob and kill them. Half allowed them inside while Susanne was preparing a dish for a dinner she was hosting that evening at home. 

According to his confession, Parker said that Zantop was "an alright guy" and that they did not need to kill him. Tulloch allegedly became angered when Zantop, a professor of earth science, told him that he had to come more prepared (for questions for the purported research). Tulloch resented the comments and attacked Zantop when he turned away to look for a phone number. Tulloch took his SOG Knife and repeatedly stabbed Half in the chest and face, cutting his own leg accidentally in the process. 

When Susanne came from the kitchen and tried to stop him, Parker stabbed and injured her, allegedly at Tulloch's orders. Tulloch also stabbed her in the head and body, killing her. Covered in blood, the pair left after taking $340 from Half's wallet. They left their knife sheaths at the scene.

Discovery and capture 

The Zantops' bodies were found that evening by family friend Roxana Verona, who had arrived as an invited guest for dinner. She immediately notified police.

Investigators at first speculated that it was a crime of passion by someone having an affair with Half, but that idea was soon disproved. There were several false leads. The Associated Press reported at least three persons of interest were interviewed by police and that "A task force set up after the murders also received hundreds of phone calls, letters and e-mails from people with wild theories about the killings". After finding a bloody footprint and the two distinctive knife sheaths at the scene, the police traced the knives to Parker three weeks after the murders.

According to the 16-year-old Parker, he had not gotten into trouble at school or in the community. He had an alibi for the time of the crime. He said that he bought the knives with Tulloch in order to build a fort. He claimed that they sold them at a surplus store after finding they were too heavy. Parker agreed to undergo fingerprinting. 

The investigators paid Tulloch a visit. At that time, they doubted that the pair were the killers and told Tulloch he was not required to speak with them. Tulloch did talk with them without a lawyer present and told them the same story as had Parker. When they asked about the deep cut above his right knee, he told them that he slipped on a rock and cut himself on a metal spigot. When they asked to fingerprint him and borrow boots for matching purposes, he signed a search warrant. 

The same request had not been made of Parker because it was suggested by a detective whom they had phoned to get his version of the story.

On the following day, Tulloch and Parker's families found that the boys had left their homes. When Parker's father found a note stating "Don't call the cops", he quickly did. Police found that Tulloch's bootprints matched those found in the Zantops' home. Fingerprints taken from the two youths matched those at the crime scene. A warrant was put out for Tulloch's arrest. Parker, still a minor, was sought for questioning in the murders. 

Believing that police would be looking for their car, the pair abandoned Parker's silver Audi at a truck stop in Sturbridge, Massachusetts, intending to hitchhike to California. A truck driver who picked them up in New Jersey announced their intent to travel west via CB radio. A police officer, pretending to be another driver, offered to pick them up. At the Flying J truck stop in Spiceland, Indiana, the pair were captured and taken into custody by authorities.

Prosecution 
One of the prosecutors in this case was assistant Attorney General Kelly Ayotte. She later was appointed as the State Attorney General. Later still she was elected as a U.S. Senator.

The two youths were indicted on a range of charges. The indictment said that they had made four previous tries over six months to gain entry to houses in the area in Vermont and New Hampshire, with the intent of robbing their victims, getting their ATM cards and passwords, and then killing them. In the first case, on July 19, 2000, they cut the telephone wires to a house in Vershire, Vermont, before Tulloch knocked on the door and tried to gain entry with a story about his car having broken down. He was refused entry, as they were in the other three instances before they attacked the Zantops.

After the two young men were captured and jailed pending trial, the prosecution charged Parker as an adult because of the severity of the crime, making him liable to stand trial. He made a plea bargain with the state in which he would testify against Tulloch as a witness, plead guilty to second-degree murder, and receive a maximum sentence of twenty-five years to life with a possibility of parole after 16 years. The profits from any book deals or movie offers that he might agree to will go directly to the Zantops' children. 

Tulloch's lawyer tried, without success, to have Tulloch certified as suffering from mental illness, in order to use the insanity defense. Tulloch pleaded guilty to first-degree murder.

Sentencing
During the sentencing hearing, Parker wept and expressed remorse during his apology for his part in the killings. He was sentenced to 25 years with a possibility of parole after 16 years.

After Tulloch's guilty plea, he was sentenced to life imprisonment without parole. He showed no emotion at the sentencing hearing and made no statement.

Aftermath (as of 2015)

Parker is being held in the New Hampshire State Prison for Men in Concord. He has been classified as a Custody Level 3 prisoner (medium custody), which means that he has freedom to move within the prison except for head counts and lock downs at night. This classification allows inmates to leave their cells until the mandatory lockdown at 11 P.M. Prison officials have reported that Parker takes part in play productions put on by inmates, works at arts and crafts, plays guitar and practices yoga. 

Tulloch is held in the same prison (after beginning his sentence at the Northern New Hampshire Correctional Facility in Berlin). He is also in Custody Level 3 (medium custody). He eats meals in the same chow hall at the same time as Parker. Their contact is reported as minimal.

Tulloch eligible for judicial review for re-sentencing
In 2012 the US Supreme Court ruled in Miller v. Alabama that mandatory sentencing to life imprisonment without parole of persons who committed a crime as juveniles was unconstitutional. It ruled that this decision needed to be applied retroactively, with cases to be reviewed of persons sentenced to LWOP for crimes committed as juveniles. Their ruling was based on scientific studies that have shown conclusively that juvenile brains are still unformed. The high court based their decision on the basis that juvenile offenders have “diminished culpability and greater prospects for reform” and judges should be able to consider the “mitigating qualities of youth” in sentencing.

In August 2014, the New Hampshire Supreme Court ruled that Tulloch's case would be among four to be reviewed by the court for re-sentencing. The initial review had been appealed by the state attorney general. Parker is not affected by this ruling because he was not charged with first-degree murder, an adult charge that carries a mandatory LWOP sentence. After review of different factors in the case, the court could re-sentence Tulloch to life imprisonment without parole.

References

External links 

 Noe, Denise, The Dartmouth Murders Case, CourtTV Crime Library

Further reading 
 
 
 
 

Dartmouth College history
Murder in New Hampshire
2001 murders in the United States
2001 in New Hampshire
Crimes in New Hampshire
Murder committed by minors